The pygmy web-footed salamander (Bolitoglossa pygmaea) is a species of salamander in the family Plethodontidae.
It is endemic to Costa Rica.

References

 Bolaños, F. & D. B. Wake. 2009: Two new species of montane web-footed salamanders (Plethodontidae: Bolitoglossa) from the Costa Rica-Panamá border region. Zootaxa, 1981: 57–68. Abstract

Bolitoglossa
Endemic fauna of Costa Rica
Amphibians described in 2009